In algebraic geometry, Nash blowing-up is a process in which, roughly speaking, each singular point is replaced by all limiting positions of the tangent spaces at the non-singular points.

Although the above construction uses an embedding, the Nash blow-up itself is unique up to unique isomorphism.

Properties

 Nash blowing-up is locally a monoidal transformation.
 If X is a complete intersection defined by the vanishing of  then the Nash blow-up is the blow-up with center given by the ideal generated by the (n − r)-minors of the matrix with entries .
 For a variety over a field of characteristic zero, the Nash blow-up is an isomorphism if and only if X is non-singular. 
 For an algebraic curve over an algebraically closed field of characteristic zero, repeated Nash blowing-up leads to desingularization after a finite number of steps. 
 Both of the prior properties may fail in positive characteristic. Since the center is a hypersurface the blow-up is an isomorphism.

See also

 Blowing up
 Resolution of singularities

References

Algebraic geometry